"Time to Rock" is the debut single by Italian DJ/producer Gabry Ponte featuring Italian singer Stefania Piovesan.
It became a hit in Italy, Spain and Germany. The single was later released in the United States in December 2002 by MCA Records.

Peak positions

References

2002 songs
2002 debut singles
Gabry Ponte songs
MCA Records singles
Song articles with missing songwriters